American Girls is a 1918 Dutch silent drama film directed by Maurits Binger.

Cast
 Lola Cornero - Lola
 Beppie De Vries - Beppie
 Margie Morris - Margie
 Adelqui Migliar - Adelqui
 Annie Bos - Anny
 Jan van Dommelen - Jan Dommel
 Louis Davids - Tinus / Various Roles
 Cor Smits - Miljonair Brown
 Paula de Waart - Polly Dewar
 Marcello Lanfredi
 Max van Gelder - Man theaterbureau

External links 
 

Dutch silent feature films
1918 films
Dutch black-and-white films
1918 drama films
Films directed by Maurits Binger
Dutch drama films
Silent drama films